William Robert Sutherland (May 10, 1936 – February 18, 2020) was an American computer scientist who was the longtime manager of three prominent research laboratories, including Sun Microsystems Laboratories (1992–1998), the Systems Science Laboratory at Xerox PARC (1975–1981), and the Computer Science Division of Bolt, Beranek and Newman, Inc. which helped develop the ARPANET.

In these roles, Sutherland participated in the creation of the personal computer, the technology of advanced microprocessors, the Smalltalk programming language, the Java programming language and the Internet.

Unlike traditional corporate research managers, Sutherland added individuals from fields like psychology, cognitive science, and anthropology to enhance the work of his technology staff. He also directed his scientists to take their research, like the Xerox Alto "personal" computer, outside of the laboratory to allow people to use it in a corporate setting and to observe their interaction with it.

In addition, Sutherland fostered a collaboration between the researchers at California Institute of Technology developing techniques of very large scale integrated circuits (VLSI) — his brother Ivan and Carver Mead — and Lynn Conway of his PARC staff. With PARC resources made available by Sutherland, Mead and Conway developed a textbook and university syllabus that helped expedite the development and distribution of a technology whose effect is now immeasurable.

Sutherland said that a research lab is primarily a teaching institution, "teaching whatever is new so that the new can become familiar, old, and used widely."

Sutherland was born in Hastings, Nebraska, on May 10, 1936, to a father from New Zealand; his mother was from Scotland. The family moved to Wilmette, Illinois, then Scarsdale, New York, for his father's career. Bert Sutherland graduated from Scarsdale High School, then received his bachelor's degree in electrical engineering from Rensselaer Polytechnic Institute (RPI), and his master's degree and Ph.D. from Massachusetts Institute of Technology (MIT); his thesis advisor was Claude Shannon. During his military service in the United States Navy, he was awarded the Legion of Merit as a Carrier ASW plane commander. He was the older brother of Ivan Sutherland. Bert Sutherland died on February 18, 2020, aged 83.

References 

1936 births
2020 deaths
Sun Microsystems people
Recipients of the Legion of Merit
Rensselaer Polytechnic Institute alumni
United States Navy officers
Scientists at PARC (company)
People from Hastings, Nebraska
Scientists from Nebraska
American people of Scottish descent
American people of New Zealand descent
Scientists from New York (state)
People from Scarsdale, New York
Scarsdale High School alumni